K-407 Novomoskovsk is a Project 667BDRM Delfin-class ballistic missile submarine (NATO reporting name Delta IV) of the Russian Navy's Northern Fleet.

Background
Construction of the nuclear submarine K-407 Novomoskovsk began at the Northern Machinebuilding Enterprise (Sevmash) in Severodvinsk on 2 February 1987, and it became part of the Soviet Navy on 27 November 1990. She was the last of seven 667BDRM Delfin submarines and the last SSBN submarine built in the USSR. This class of submarines was developed at the Rubin Design Bureau in 1975 and is considered one of the most successful Soviet submarine missile carrier designs.

Specification

The submarine has a submerged displacement of 18,200 tons and a surface displacement of 11,700 tons. It carries a crew of 135. Armaments include a D-9RM missile system (16 RSM-54 ballistic missiles) and four  torpedo tubes.

The RSM-54 missile (3M37, R-29RM, or SS-N-23 according to the NATO classification) is a liquid-propellant, three-stage missile with separable heads (it carries four or ten warheads depending on the modification).

History

On 6 August 1991 21:09 Novomoskovsk, under the command of Captain Second Rank Sergey Yegorov, became the world's only submarine to successfully launch an all-missile salvo, launching 16 ballistic missiles (RSM-54) of total weight of almost 700 tons at an interval of several seconds (operation code name "Behemoth-2"). The first and the last missiles hit their targets successfully, while the others were self-destroyed in the air according to the plan. This operation was considered by the Soviet Navy as a part of possible nuclear war scenario ("Dress rehearsal of the Apocalypse") and experimentally confirmed the technical possibility of a safe underwater all-missile salvo. Politically, the Soviet ballistic missile submarines passed a reasonability check as a part of strategic triad. The previous attempt of an all-missile salvo (operation code name "Behemoth") was performed in 1989 and finished unsuccessfully, however with no casualties. As the experiment took place just before the August Putsch in the USSR, its results were forgotten for a while, and the crew's work wasn't rewarded by the Soviet government authorities.

The American submarine was trailing the Russian submarine and miscalculated its speed. Both submarines returned to their homeports, and though badly damaged both returned to service. Grayling was decommissioned some four years later, while Novomoskovsk remains in service almost 25 years later.

In 1996, Novomoskovsk, together with the submarine , successfully fired a batch of ballistic missiles. The city of Novomoskovsk in Tula Oblast took the submarine under its patronage, and on June 19, 1997, K-407 received the name Novomoskovsk.

On 7 July 1998, Novomoskovsk, under the command of Captain 1st Rank Aleksandr Moiseyev, launched a Shtil-1 carrier rocket with two German scientific Tubsat-N and Tubsat-N1 microsatellites while submerged in the Barents Sea.

The satellite, developed by Berlin Technical University, was placed in orbit on an SS-N-23 (RSM-54)-type ballistic missile. The Northern Fleet was paid some 200,000 German Mark (US$111,000) for the launch.

In 1999, Novomoskovsk pioneered the launch of a ballistic missile from the geographic location of the North Pole.

On 17 February 2004, Novomoskovsk seemingly attempted to test-fire a SS-N-23 ballistic missile, but the missile failed to come out of its silo because of an unspecified technical problem.  The Russian Navy, despite earlier statements describing the test, explained that no "physical" launch was intended at all: the exercise was supposed to be a simulation. President of Russia Vladimir Putin was aboard , an Akula-class ballistic missile submarine (NATO reporting name Typhoon), to observe the exercise.

On 17 March 2004, Novomoskovsk physically test-fired two SS-N-23 ballistic missiles, successfully hitting designated practice targets on the Kamchatka Peninsula.

Like the other 667BDRM Delfin ships in service with the Northern Fleet, K-407 is slated to receive new SLBMs to replace the RSM-54. The missile is a new-build, minor modernization of the RSM-54. It does not bear a separate designator from the RSM-54/R-29RM/SS-N-23 asides from the name "Sineva". Testing of the R-29RM "Sineva" was completed in June 2004. Novomoskovsk is the third Delfin-class submarine in line to receive the new missile (after her siblings K-51 Verkhoturye and K-84 Ekaterinburg). She was fully overhauled and modernized in 2006 before returning to service.

In July 2006, cleric of Aleksandr Nevskiy Cathedral, the head of the Diocesan department on interaction with the Armed Forces and law enforcement agencies, priest Leonid Leontiuk was temporarily included in the personnel list of the K-18 Kareliya and was on board of K-407 Novomoskovsk. During the deployment the priest has performed the consecration ceremony of submarine's compartments, met with submarine personnel, led discussions on the basics of faith and spiritual life. Six sailors got baptized on board.

In November 2008 K-407 Novomoskovsk went to the Zvezdochka plant for general overhaul and modernization. On 29 July 2012 the refit was finished and the submarine returned to active service.

The submarine was expected to remain in service until 2020. However, she was still listed in commission as of 2022.

2010s
Novomoskovsk was described in Russian sources as being "worthy" of the proud name of "the most shooting" submarine of the Russian Navy. The submarine is part of the 31st Order of the Red Banner underwater strategic missile cruiser division of the 12th submarine squadron of the Northern Fleet (Olenya Bay, Skalisty Naval Base). The submarine's commander in 2012 was Captain Stepan Kelbas.

As a member of association of Russian regions and cities, patrons of Northern Fleet ships and units, the Tula Oblast patronages K-114 Tula and K-407 Novomoskovsk submarines and assists in "patriotic education" and preparation of young people for serving in the Armed Forces of the Russian Federation. Citizens of Novomoskovsk have preference to serve on K-407 Novomoskovsk. The submarine crew are regularly provided by humanitarian goods and visited by the city authorities.

In popular culture
In 2007, Russian plastic model manufacturer Alanger introduced a 1:350 scale model of K-407 Novomoskovsk.

Notes

References
 Yuriy Apalkov, Podvodnyye lodki, vol. 1, part 1 "RPKSN i mnogotselevyye PL" (St. Petersburg: Galea Print, 2002).
 Yuriy Apalkov, Podvodnyye lodki, vol. 1, part 2 "Mnogotselevyye PL i PL spetsnaznacheniya"  (St. Petersburg: Galea Print, 2003).
 S.S. Berezhnoy, Atomnyye podvodnyye lodki: VMF SSSR i Rossii (Moscow: Naval Kollektsiya, 2001).
 V. Demyanovskiy et al., Podvodnyy shchit SSSR, vol. 1 "Atomnyye mnogotselevyye podvodnyye lodki" (Rybnisk: Star, 2003).
 Jane's Fighting Ships (2004–2005), 591.

External links
Операция "Бегемот" 
Photogallery of sub in December 2010 at www.flot.ru
Strategic Fleet (Russian strategic nuclear forces)
Ballistic missile submarine K-407 "Novomoskovsk" 
The History of Nuclear Submarine K-407 "Novomoskovsk" 
667BDRM "Delfin" Serie 
Николай Черкашин. Не надо орденов, была бы Родина 
Александр Железняков. Операция "Бегемот-2" 
Operation "Behemoth". TV show "Smotr" broadcast on 23.12.2006, including  documentary video 
Bombers and submarines launch missiles during exercises
К-407, "Новомосковск" проект 667БДРМ. Штурм Глубины. 

Delta-class submarines
Ships built in the Soviet Union
1990 ships
Cold War submarines of the Soviet Union
Submarines of Russia
Ships of the Russian Northern Fleet
Maritime incidents in 1993
Ships built by Sevmash